Fort Richmond is a provincial electoral division in the Canadian province of Manitoba. It was created by redistribution in 2008, out of parts of St. Norbert and Fort Garry.

As of electoral redistribution in 2018, which took effect the following year, it is bordered by the ridings of Fort Garry on the north, Riel on the east, Seine River on the south, and Waverley on the west. The riding's population in 2006 was 20,750. Located in the riding is the University of Manitoba, the largest post-secondary school in the province.

List of provincial representatives

Electoral results

2011 general election

2016 general election

2019 general election

References

Manitoba provincial electoral districts
Politics of Winnipeg